Afifa is either a surname or a given name.

Notable people with the surname
Abdulla Afifa (born 1991), Qatari footballer
Mohamed Saeed Afifa (born 1962), Qatari footballer

Notable people with the given name
Afifa Al Shartouni (1886–1906), Lebanese author
Afifa Iskandar (1921–2012), Iraqi singer
Afifa Karam (1883–1924), Lebanese-American journalist, novelist, and translator